The Vice Co. Blockbusters is a professional men's volleyball team playing in the Premier Volleyball League (PVL). The team is owned by comedian and TV host Vice Ganda.

Current roster 
This is the roster of Vice Co. Blockbusters.

For the 2018 Premier Volleyball League Reinforced Conference:

Coaching staff
 Head coach: Reynaldo Diaz Jr.
 Assistant coaches: Manolo Refugia

Team Staff
 Team managers: Vice Ganda Budi Montecarlo Sammy Gaddi Teejay Payongayong Rimney Kim Morales
 Trainers: Brendon Santos Erickson Joseph Lazaga Ramos
 Statistician: Kelvin Kris Chiu
 Utility: Christian Detablan
 Photographer: Chax Cabrera

Medical Staff
 Team physician: Millicent Sy-Tan
 Physical Therapist: Kim Robert Yap Bejo

Honors

Team 
Premier Volleyball League

Individual 
Premier Volleyball League

References 

Men's volleyball teams in the Philippines
Sports teams in Metro Manila
Volleyball clubs established in 2018
2018 establishments in the Philippines